Vasil Ringov (Macedonian: Bacил Pингoв, born 17 April 1955) is a retired Yugoslav football player.

Club career
Born in Strumica (SR Macedonia, SFR Yugoslavia), he is considered to be one of the best Macedonian footballers ever, along with Golden Shoe winner, Darko Pančev. He started playing while still a teenager for FK Belasica Strumica, after that he moved to Belgrade giants FK Partizan, but after not getting many chances there, he moved to Second League side FK Teteks where he would become the club's main star. It was two years later that he caught the attention of another Macedonian club in the Second League, Skopje's FK Vardar. After another two seasons, and with Ringov's help, Vardar returned to the Yugoslav First League where they would play during most of the 1980s. He became the main player at the club, having played until 1986 more than 200 league matches and scoring 93 league goals for them. It was in Skopje that Ringov played most of his career, being the exceptions a short half season spell in another top-league club NK Dinamo Zagreb, and near the end of his playing career, another half season spell, this time in 2. German Bundesliga club Eintracht Braunschweig.

References

External links
 German career stats – FuPa
 

1955 births
Living people
Sportspeople from Strumica
Association football midfielders
Yugoslav footballers
Macedonian footballers
FK Belasica players
FK Partizan players
FK Teteks players
FK Vardar players
GNK Dinamo Zagreb players
Eintracht Braunschweig players
Yugoslav First League players
Yugoslav Second League players
2. Bundesliga players
Yugoslav expatriate footballers
Macedonian expatriate footballers
Expatriate footballers in Germany
Yugoslav expatriate sportspeople in Germany
Macedonian expatriate sportspeople in Germany